The Kitulo Plateau, formerly known as the Elton Plateau, (meaning 'The Garden of God'), is a plateau in Tanzania's Kipengere Range known for its floral diversity. The plateau is in Kitulo National Park. 

This montane grassland area was the first area in East Africa to become a national park because of its unique flora. Botanists have referred to it as the Serengeti of Flowers.

See also
Wildlife of Tanzania

References

Landforms of Tanzania
Southern Highlands, Tanzania
Southern Rift montane forest–grassland mosaic
Important Bird Areas of Tanzania